Michael Wilson Ivie (born August 8, 1952), is an American former professional baseball player. He played as a first baseman in Major League Baseball for the San Diego Padres, San Francisco Giants, Houston Astros, and Detroit Tigers during his career from 1971 to 1983. In addition to playing first base, Ivie put in considerable time as a third baseman, a left fielder and was a designated hitter.

Ivie is one of only five Major League Baseball players to hit two pinch-hit grand slams in the same season. The others are Davey Johnson of the Philadelphia Phillies, Darryl Strawberry of the New York Yankees, Ben Broussard of the Cleveland Indians, and Brooks Conrad of the Atlanta Braves.

Baseball career

Mike Ivie was drafted first overall in the 1970 Major League Baseball Draft as a catcher by the San Diego Padres. He began his career in the Padres' minor league system, where he once hit 21 homers in 21 games. He made his major league debut as an 18-year-old in 1971. Even though he was a catcher in the minor leagues, he occasionally started as a third baseman, but was then moved to first base and made the Padres in 1974. During the 1978 off season, he was traded from the Padres to the San Francisco Giants in exchange for Derrel Thomas.

During the 1978 season, which was to become one of the most memorable National League West races of all time, Ivie played a significant role in helping the Giants win and stay in contention for first place throughout most of the season. On May 28, 1978 during the 6th inning of a game between the Giants and Los Angeles Dodgers, whose rivalry was in full force that season, Ivie was called upon to pinch hit.  After the count went to 0–2, Ivie hit the next pitch from Dodger ace Don Sutton into the left field bleachers for a grand slam.  As the ball cleared the left field fence, Darrell Evans, Jack Clark and Larry Herndon all scored while the largest paid crowd at Candlestick Park erupted.  Ivie was mobbed at home plate by the Giants. The Dodgers tied it in the 7th, but the Giants won the game by a score of 6–5.  He went on to hit a total of 4 pinch hit home runs  that year.

After the 1978 season, Ivie was the talk of a trade rumor involving the Minnesota Twins to bring Rod Carew to the Giants. The trade fell through and Carew ended up with
the California Angels. Ivie went on to hit a career high 27 home runs and 89 RBI for the Giants in 1979.
Going into the 1980 season, Ivie was considered the Giants' successor at first base to Willie McCovey upon his retirement, but after an off-season accident with a hunting knife in which he sliced part of his fifth finger from his hand, he was unable to perform and became a bench player. He walked away during that season, but a phone call from McCovey convinced him to return and he played out the 1980 season, hitting four home runs. In 1981, when Frank Robinson was given the job as Giants' manager after Dave Bristol was fired after the 1980 season, Ivie's career took a turn. Even though he was reported to have a good attitude during spring training and worked hard, he lost the starting first base job to free agent Enos Cabell, acquired during the off season. Ivie was dealt from the Giants to the Houston Astros for Dave Bergman and Jeffrey Leonard on April 20, 1981. He asked for his release, which was granted.
He then called on Sparky Anderson, manager of the Detroit Tigers, and he was signed to play first base and designated hitter. He was their starting first baseman or DH during the 1982 season and hit 14 home runs. During the 1983 season, Ivie was released by the Tigers and retired from baseball.

Trades involving Ivie
 February 28, 1978 - Traded by the San Diego Padres to the San Francisco Giants for Derrel Thomas.
 April 20, 1981 - Traded by the San Francisco Giants to the Houston Astros for Dave Bergman and Jeffrey Leonard.

References

External links

 Mike Ivie at Baseball Library

1952 births
Living people
Baseball players from Atlanta
San Diego Padres players
San Francisco Giants players
Houston Astros players
Detroit Tigers players
Major League Baseball first basemen
Hawaii Islanders players
Tri-City Padres players
Alexandria Aces players
Lodi Padres players